Babin  (formerly German Babbin) is a village in the administrative district of Gmina Bielice, within Pyrzyce County, West Pomeranian Voivodeship, in north-western Poland.

The village has a population of 290.

References

Babin